Complicated Mess is the second studio album of American singer-songwriter Debra Arlyn.  It was released independently by Homeslice Records in the United States on August 8, 2006.

Background 
Debra Arlyn released her first independent album Thinking Out Loud in 2005 and took the album to Los Angeles in hopes of securing a major label record deal.  Feedback from the managers and labels at the time was that her look and sound were good, but she'd have to focus on her songwriting. After returning to Oregon, began writing and touring locally to begin work on her next album, Complicated Mess.  Complicated Mess was written and produced in mind with sounding commercial as to appeal to major record labels for another round of showcasing.  Arlyn recorded the album at home in her own studio with her touring band and produced the album herself.

When the album was completed, she began another round of label showcasing and played for many different major labels, but did not secure a record deal. Returning to Oregon, she decided to continue on with music and focused on being an independent artist and touring to support herself. Arlyn did garner some success from the album when tracks such as "Why Can't We Start Over?" were featured on the television show Related.

Songs and themes 
The songs on the album largely revolve around love, relationships and romantic themes.  Most songs were written based on experiences Arlyn had with current and former boyfriends. Songs are based around piano composition, which is Arlyn's primary instrument.

Track listing
All songs written by Debra Arlyn

Personnel

Musicians
 Debra Arlyn: Vocals, Piano, Synth, Clav, Rhodes
 Lance Seiders: Bass
 Kevin Colis: Guitar (tracks 1,5,6,9)
 Christian Kremer: Guitar (tracks 2,3,4,7,8,10)
 David Samuel: Guitar (tracks 3,7)
 James West: Drums (tracks 1,6,9)
 Kevin Van Walk: Drums (tracks 2,3,4,7,8,10)
 Matt Kimmel: Drums (track 5)
 Tim Mclaughlin: Horns (track 8)
 Matt Calkins: Horns (track 8)

Production
 Debra Arlyn: Producer
 Steve Sundholm: Masterer and mixer
 Lance Seiders: Engineer
 Jeff Xandier: Photography
 Christian Shope: Additional photography
 Tony Arlyn: Management

References

2006 albums